Tour de India is a three city cycling event that was held in India. The first edition took place in 2012  in Mumbai, Srinagar & Delhi, and in 2013 the races were held in Mumbai, Jaipur and Delhi. Having received an affiliation from the Union Cycliste Internationale (UCI), the cycling event had cyclists participating from India and abroad. The event was brought to India by Dr. Akil Khan, and was sponsored by Godrej Eon from the first edition.

Vaibhav Vinay Maloo was the managing director of Tour de India in 2013. During his term, he tied up with University of Cambridge students to come and do a study on their operational model, and came up with ways to promote cycling as a sport in India.

In 2013, Ensocare Healthcare Solutions, a subsidiary of Enso Group led by Vinay Maloo, supported the event to create more awareness about fitness and cycling in India.

As of 2013 year the race categories were:

For Mumbai and Delhi
 Full Cyclothon
 Half Cyclothon
 Green Cyclothon
 Champions of Cyclothon 
 International

For Jaipur
 Green Cyclothon
 Champions of Cyclothon
 International

References

External links
 http://in.movies.yahoo.com/news/john-abraham-becomes-brand-ambassador-tour-india-2013-183000530.html 
 Tour de India Official Trailer- YouTube 

Cycling in India